Mirza Tofazzal Hossain Mukul was a Bangladesh Awami League politician and the former Member of Parliament of Tangail-5.

Career
Mukul was elected to parliament from Tangail-5 as a Bangladesh Awami League candidate in 1973. He was the former President of Tangail District unit of Bangladesh Awami League and Tangail District Bar Association.

Death and legacy
Mukul died on 5 April 2016 in Bangabandhu Sheikh Mujib Medical University Hospital, Dhaka, Bangladesh. His son in law, Abdur Rahman, is the member of parliament from Faridpur-1.

On 22 January 2022, Mukul was awarded the Ekushey Padak, the second most important award for civilians in Bangladesh.

References

Awami League politicians
2016 deaths
1st Jatiya Sangsad members
Recipients of the Ekushey Padak